The 2022 Classic Lorient Agglomération–Trophée Ceratizit featured as the twentieth round of the 2022 UCI Women's World Tour and was held on 27 August 2022, in Plouay, France.

Teams
141 riders from 24 teams started the race. Each team has a maximum of six riders. 86 riders finished the race within the time limit. 

UCI Women's WorldTeams

 
 
 
 
 
 
 
 
 
 
 
 
 

UCI Women's Continental Teams

Results

References

External links
 Official site

GP de Plouay
GP de Plouay
GP de Plouay
GP de Plouay